Bhanumati is the wife of Duryodhana, the main antagonist of the epic Mahabharata Originally unnamed in the epic, the name of Duryodhana's wife is added in later versions. Bhanumati's children are Laxman Kumara and Lakshmanaa.

In the Mahabharata, Duryodhana's wife is mentioned thrice. In the Shanti Parva book, Duryodhana abducted king Chitrangada's daughter from her swayamvara with the help of Karna. Later, she is described by her mother-in-law, Gandhari, in the Stri Parva book.

Textual sources and development
Bhanumati is never directly mentioned in the Mahabharata. In the Shalya Parva, Duryodhana expresses his sorrow over the fate of the mother of his son, Laxman Kumara. In the Stri Parva, Gandhari (mother of Duryodhana) mentions her daughter-in-law. In the Shanti Parva, the sage Narada narrates a story about the friendship of Duryodhana and Karna. Here, Karna helps his friend in abducting the daughter of Kalinga king Chitrāngada from her Swayamvar. As Duryodhana's wife is unnamed in the epic, her name is provided by the folktales.

Description in the Mahabharata
In the Stri Parva of Mahabharata, Gandhari, mother of Duryodhana, describes her daughter in law to Krishna in the following manner.

Marriage with Duryodhana 
Duryodhana's marriage is found in the Shanti Parva of Mahabharata. The tale of the Swayamvar of Chitrangada's daughter is narrated by Narada, the god sage. The text never mentions the name of the princess but states that she is fair and beautiful.

Duryodhana was invited to the Svayamvara of the daughter of King Chitrangada of Kalinga. In some versions of the epic, Chitrangada is instead described as the king of Kashi. Duryodhana went to the city of Rajapura, taking along his dear friend Karna. Many legendary rulers like Shishupala, Jarasandha, Bhishmaka, Vakra, Kapotaroman, Nila, Rukmi, Sringa, Asoka, Satadhanwan etc. attended the ceremony. After the commencing of the ceremony, the lovely princess entered the arena with a garland in her hand, surrounded by her nursemaid and bodyguards. As she was being informed about the names of the participants & their lineage, she walked away from Duryodhana. Duryodhana refuses to accept her rejection and already smitten by the princess, took her away on his chariot challenging other suitors to beat him & Karna. Karna successfully battled with the rest of the suitors to protect his friend. Karna easily defeated the pursuing Kings and the other royal suitors abandoned their pursuit after seeing Karna's fighting prowess. On reaching Hastinapur, Duryodhana justified his act by giving the example of his great grandfather Bhishma abducting three princesses of Kashi for his stepbrother, Vichitravirya. Finally, the fair lady consented and married Duryodhana.

Regional stories and folktales 
Though Bhanumati is a minor character in the original Mahabharata, she appears in many regional stories and folktales.

The dice match with Karna

The popular tale is a Tamil folktale and is not mentioned in the Mahabharata. One day, Duryodhana requested Karna to take care of Bhanumati  and entertain her for the evening as he had duties to be taken care of. To pass time, Karna and Bhanumati  began playing a game of dice. The game soon got very interesting, engrossing the two of them completely. Gradually, Karna started winning. Meanwhile, Duryodhana returned early and entered the room. Seeing her husband come in, Bhanumati  immediately stood up as a mark of respect. Karna, whose back was facing the door, did not realize this and misconstrued her intent, thinking that she was leaving because she was on the losing side.

Karna, before realizing his friend's arrival, grabbed Bhanumati's shawl and pulled her towards him. His action leads her pearl ornaments to scatter, making it more inappropriate. Her veil also slipped along with the shawl, so she was half-dressed. Bhanumati, who was as yet, not so familiar with Karna, froze at the thought of how her husband would react.

Karna, following Bhanumati's stunned gaze, turned around to see Duryodhana observing them both carefully. He stood in shame, embarrassment and guilt, considering the wrath and inevitable punishment he was going to face from his friend. He was sure Duryodhana would immediately accuse them of impropriety. However, much to both their surprise, Duryodhana looked past Karna, and addressed his wife, "Should I just collect the beads, or would you like me to string them, as well?”

Bhanumati and Karna could only look at each other in shock, mutely, feeling ashamed at the way they had both severely misjudged him. He had implicit faith and great love for his queen, and even greater was his faith in his friend Karna. Not for a moment did he suspect that the man he had considered his brother would ever betray him, and only quietly picked up the pearls trustfully. This story is not present in the Vyasa Mahabharata but is often commonly told when discussing Karna and Duryodhana's genuine friendship or Duryodhana's trust towards his wife and his friend.

Supriya's marriage
In Shivaji Sawant's novel Mritunjaya, which is based on the life of Karna, Bhanumati had a maid named Supriya, who was very close to her. When Duryodhana and Karna abducted Bhanumati, Supriya also followed them. Later, when Bhanumati accepted Duryodhana as her spouse, Supriya chose Karna as her husband.

Shalya's daughter in Indonesia
According to a folktale of Indonesia, Bhanumati is the daughter of Shalya, uncle of Nakula and Sahadeva, making her their cousins. As per the story, Bhanumati wanted to marry Arjuna but she married Duryodhana as per her father's wish. As Duryodhan was his son-in-law, Shalya supported the Kaurava side in the Kurukshetra War.

In popular culture
 In 1857 Kaliprasanna Singha, then 16 years old, played Bhanumati in a Bengal performance. 
 Portrayed by Shubhi Ahuja in Suryaputra Karn television series
 Portrayed by Ravneet Kaur in Karn Sangini, 2018 television series

References

Bibliography

External links 

Characters in the Mahabharata